Jonathan "Jon" McKain (born 21 September 1982) is a Scottish Australian football player who retired from professional football in 2016 after a long and successful career. He played in countries including Romania, Australia, Saudi Arabia, and Malaysia and was a fan favourite for his whole harted displays and football abilities. After professional retirement, he played for the Rochedale Rovers in FQPL. He is generally a defender but can also play as a defensive midfielder. He was a forceful ball playing center back or midfielder who was recognised for his work rate and discipline

Club career
McKain was educated at the Anglican Church Grammar School, and he joined Romania club FC Politehnica in the summer of 2005, from fellow Divizia A club FC Naţional București. He had enjoyable success in Romanian and was very well regarded throughout the league by players, coaches, media and fans. He was approached to seek his interest to play for Romania National team after his first season but his heart was always with Australia. He has also played for the Brisbane Strikers in Australia prior to his time in Romania

McKain signed for the Wellington Phoenix for the 2008–2009 A-League season and became a pivotal part of the sides most recognisable period. Despite several injuries McKain maintained excellent form when fit which spark several offers from other A-League clubs and overseas interest.
On 14 June 2010, McKain signed a one-year renewable contract for Al-Nassr to be added to Walter Zenga squad. A US$ 1.5 million transfer fee was paid.

After his successful stint in the Middle East with Saudi Arabia club Al-Nassr, McKain returned to Australia, and signed an undisclosed contract with Adelaide United.

In August 2011, McKain was named as Adelaide United's captain ahead of the 2011–12 A-League season after impressing in pre-season friendlies and coaching staff. and played for the club for 3 seasons.

In October 2014, McKain signed for Malaysia Super League club Kelantan FA. He quickly impressed the fans with a goal he scored during a match with LionsXII that ended up in 2–0 win in their homeground stadium and went on to play for 2 successful seasons for the Red Warriors Sultan Muhammad IV Stadium, Kota Bharu, Kelantan in 2015

McKain announce his retirement from professional football on his Twitter account in 2016, after a 17 year career. He continued to play semi-professional football in Brisbane for Souths United in the FQPL and then for two seasons for Rochedale Rovers before finishing playing in 2019.

International career
McKain has represented Australia and made three appearances at the 2005 Confederations Cup in Germany.  He also represented Australia at the 2004 Olympics and the 2011 Asian Cup in Qatar

Career statistics

National team statistics

Honours
With Australia:
 OFC Nations Cup: 2004
With Kelantan FA:
Malaysia FA Cup:2015 (runner up)

References

External links
 Adelaide United profile
 
 Jon McKain at Aussie Footballers

1982 births
Living people
Soccer players from Brisbane
Australian soccer players
Adelaide United FC players
Australian expatriate soccer players
Australian people of Scottish descent
Olympic soccer players of Australia
Footballers at the 2004 Summer Olympics
Australia international soccer players
2005 FIFA Confederations Cup players
2011 AFC Asian Cup players
Brisbane Strikers FC players
FC Progresul București players
FC Politehnica Timișoara players
A-League Men players
Wellington Phoenix FC players
Expatriate footballers in Romania
Australian expatriate sportspeople in Romania
Liga I players
Expatriate association footballers in New Zealand
National Soccer League (Australia) players
Al Nassr FC players
Kelantan FA players
People educated at Anglican Church Grammar School
Association football defenders
Saudi Professional League players
Australian expatriate sportspeople in Saudi Arabia